Gearóid O'Sullivan (28 January 1891 – 25 March 1948) was an Irish teacher, Irish language scholar, army officer, barrister and Sinn Féin and Fine Gael politician.

Early life and education
Jeremiah O'Sullivan was born in Coolnagurrane near Skibbereen, County Cork, he was the fourth son of Michael and Margaret O'Sullivan and given the name of Jeremiah - but known throughout his lifetime as Gearóid. His father, a native of Lough Ine, and his mother, née McCarthy, a Coolnagurrane native, were members of West Cork farming families. Early in his education at the local national primary school, his intellectual capacity and promise of greater things was often remarked upon. Despite his young age, he was selected school monitor – to monitor the progression of fellow students as well as the teaching capabilities of the teacher.

He next studied at Daniel Duggan's Intermediate and University School in Skibbereen; at about this time, he was to meet several individuals who would draw him further into the Irish nationalist movement and deepen his appreciation of Irish language and culture. These included James Duggan, a local Sinn Féin activist and acquaintance of Gearóid's cousin Michael Collins. The two shared a grandmother on the McCarthy side of their respective families. Duggan encouraged Gearóid to join the Gaelic League, which he did at the age of ten in October 1900. Notably, Gearóid's father, Michael O'Sullivan, chose to complete the family's 1911 Census form in Irish.

In 1909, O'Sullivan started at St Patrick's College of Education, in Drumcondra, Dublin, to train for a career in teaching.  While not quite 19, he had already completed the second arts examination of the Royal University of Ireland.  He took up teaching in 1911. A first posting was to Kildorrey, Cork in 1912, but soon transferred back to Dublin to teach at St Peter's National School, Phibsborough. He joined the Keating branch of the Gaelic League, quickly assuming a leadership role within the organisation and tirelessly travelling to teach Irish to League members while also studying for H Dip Ed at the National University and drilling with the Irish Volunteers. At 25 Parnell Square, the drill hall, he established the "faine" proficiency test for recruiting.  It was also here that he became re-acquainted with Michael Collins, who joined the League in 1916 upon his return to Ireland from London, where he'd held a Postal Service position.

Easter Rising

In November 1913, O Sullivan was appointed to F Company, 1st battalion, said to be the best of Dublin Brigade. In addition to patrolling with the Irish Volunteers, O'Sullivan had the distinction shared by a small proportion of later "original IRA" members of being a member of the Irish Republican Brotherhood (IRB), which traces its roots to earlier revolutionary movements of the mid-Nineteenth Century. He also notably raised the Irish Flag over the General Post Office (GPO) in Dublin as fighting raged around the GPO and the streets of Dublin during the 1916 Easter Rising.

O'Sullivan, then 25, was the youngest IRB officer fighting in the GPO. He had been personally chosen by rebellion leader Seán Mac Diarmada to serve as his aide-de-camp. The additional honour of raising the Irish flag was given to him by another of the rebellion's leaders, Patrick Pearse. He married Maud Kiernan, sister of Kitty Kiernan, daughter of Peter and Bridget Kiernan of the Greville Arms Hotel, Granard, County Longford, with whom he had three daughters and a son. His wife died at age 40 and he remarried, to Mary ("Mae") Brennan of Belfast.

Political career

War of Independence
Following the Rising, he was interned in Frongoch internment camp in Wales with Collins and others who, unlike the rebellion's leaders such as Pearse and Mac Diarmada, escaped execution. It was here that O'Sullivan's and Collins' friendship grew into a strong bond that would last until Collins' death in August 1922. O'Sullivan – a Celtic studies scholar – helped Collins polish his usage of the Irish language, "to gather some extent folklore and foster literature."

Upon release from Frongoch, Collins and O'Sullivan resumed their involvement with the Republican movement. Released in December 1916, he intensified his Volunteer activity with the Carlow Brigade, for which cover he retained work as a teacher at Knockbeg College. The Irish Volunteers became the IRA in 1919. O'Sullivan was arrested again. Sent to Mountjoy Gaol he went on hunger strike, which precipitated his early release in December. In February 1920, at Collins' request, O'Sullivan agreed to replace him as Adjutant General of the Irish Republican Army. Joining the Supreme Council of Irish Republican Brotherhood in November 1921, he was one of Collins' closest confidantes running many secret missions for Collins, who often referred to him as "George," his undercover nom de plume. He would accompany Collins to many pivotal meetings, often risking his own capture; indeed, at one stage, there was a £3,500 bounty on his head.  In January 1922, he was made a Lieutenant-General in the new National Army, responsible for personnel and promotions.

At the 1921 general election, he was elected unopposed as a Sinn Féin Teachta Dála (TD) to the Second Dáil for the constituency of Carlow–Kilkenny. He was re-elected at the 1922 general election as a Pro-Treaty Sinn Féin TD.

Civil war
During the Irish Civil War he served as adjutant general of the National Army. He did not contest the 1923 general election.  On 28 August 1922, he was appointed to the newly created Army Council for the National Army. He was among the leadership who survived, Richard Mulcahy, Sean MacMahon, and Seán O'Murthuile.  Other officers, led by Major-General Liam Tobin resented their favoured status, their perceived dilution of Collins republican ideals, and the employment of British officers as state advisers.  O'Sullivan's appointment in 1923 as Adjutant-General had been sanctified by law in the Defence Forces (Temporary Provisions) Act.

Free State Period
After the war, he left the military to qualify as a barrister and build a career while spending time with his family with Maud Kiernan, which grew to include children Fr. Gearoid Jr., Sibeal, Ann and Sr. Trina. O'Sullivan had married Ms. Kiernan in November 1922; it was reportedly set to have been a double wedding of the Kiernan sisters Maud and Kitty Kiernan to O'Sullivan and Collins, respectively.

In 1927, after the assassination of the then Minister for Justice Kevin O'Higgins, O'Sullivan, at the request of party leaders, contested the resulting by-election in the Dublin County on 25 August and retained the seat for Cumann na nGaedheal. He was re-elected in three subsequent general elections for the party in the same constituency.

In 1933 and 1934, O'Sullivan was a supporter of Eoin O'Duffy and the Blueshirts, a militant paramilitary organisation who combined with the National Centre Party and Cumann na nGaedhael to form a new party, Fine Gael.

O'Sullivan unsuccessfully contested the 1937 general election for Fine Gael. In April 1938 he was re-elected to Seanad Éireann but was unsuccessful at the July 1938 Seanad election. Following the death of his wife in 1940, when she was just 40 years of age, O'Sullivan commenced a government service career, followed by a private legal career.

Death
O'Sullivan died on 25 March 1948, aged 56, and received a state funeral on the following Easter Monday – exactly 32 years after the Easter Rising. Thousands of people lined the streets of Dublin to watch as a horse-drawn carriage carried his coffin – draped in the same Tricolor that had covered Collins' coffin a quarter-century earlier – past the GPO and other landmarks to his final resting place at Glasnevin Cemetery. He died leaving a second wife, Mary Brennan of Belfast, and his four children.

In O'Sullivan's obituary appearing in the Irish Independent, an individual  describing himself as "a colleague" wrote of O'Sullivan's contributions to Ireland following 1916:"When the jails and prison camps opened Gearoid came back to resume the struggle. At a critical moment and at the instance of Michael Collins, he was summoned to an honourable, if highly dangerous, post – to replace Collins as Adjutant-General of the Volunteers. In the stern years that followed there was no braver heart or cooler head in the councils of the nation's army. From his dingy office, within a stone's throw of Dublin Castle, surrounded by excursions and alarms, meeting places where plans for action were settled, and thence to an uneasy rest."

References

Bibliography
 National Archives of Ireland, Military Archive, Dublin.
 Coogan, Tim Pat, Michael Collins: a biography (1990)
 Hopkinson, M, Green against Green: the civil wars (1988)
 Manning, Maurice, Blueshirts (1987, ed., reprint 1988), p. 79, 95.
 O'Broin, Leon, In great haste: the letters of Mr Collins and Kitty Kiernan (1983)
 O'Halpin, Defending Ireland: Irish Free State and its enemies since 1922 (1990), p. 50.
 O'Mahoney, Sean, Frongoch: university of revolution (1989)
 Regan, John. M., Irish Counter-Revolution 1921-38 (1999)
 Ryle Dwyer, T., Michael Collins: the man who won the war (1990)
 Ryle Dwyer, T., The Squad and Operations of Michael Collins (2005), p. 130, 194, 206.

1891 births
1948 deaths
Gearoid
Cumann na nGaedheal TDs
Fine Gael TDs
Fine Gael senators
National Army (Ireland) generals
Irish Republican Army (1919–1922) members
Early Sinn Féin TDs
Members of the 2nd Dáil
Members of the 3rd Dáil
Members of the 5th Dáil
Members of the 6th Dáil
Members of the 7th Dáil
Members of the 8th Dáil
Members of the 2nd Seanad
Members of the Irish Republican Brotherhood
People of the Easter Rising
People of the Irish Civil War (Pro-Treaty side)
Politicians from County Cork
Alumni of St Patrick's College, Dublin
People from Skibbereen